The 2010 NCAA Division I Men's Basketball Championship Game was the finals of the 2010 NCAA Division I men's basketball tournament and determined the National Champion for the 2009-10 NCAA Division I men's basketball season. The 2010 National Title Game was played on April 5, 2010 at Lucas Oil Stadium in Indianapolis, Indiana, and featured the 2010 South Regional Champions, #1 seeded Duke, and the 2010 West Regional Champions, #5 seeded Butler.

This was the fifth National Championship Game to be played between two private universities, and the first since the 1985 National Title Game between Georgetown and Villanova, won by Villanova, 66-64. The other three besides 1985 and 2010 were the 1942 National Championship Game, the 1954 National Championship Game, and the 1955 National Championship Game.

Participants

Butler

Butler entered the 2010 NCAA tournament as the #5 seed in the West Regional. In the 1st round of the 2010 NCAA Tournament, Shelvin Mack made seven three-pointers to lead Butler to a 77-59 victory over UTEP. In the 2nd round of the 2010 NCAA Tournament, Butler used late free throws from Ronald Nored and Matt Howard to beat Murray State 54-52 and advance to the Sweet 16. In the Sweet 16 of the 2010 NCAA Tournament, Butler upset top-seeded Syracuse with a 63-59 win to advance to the 2010 West Regional Finals for their 1st regional finals appearance in team history. In the Elite Eight, Butler would upset Kansas State beating them 63-56 to advance to the 2010 Final Four marking their 1st Final Four appearance in team history. In the 2010 Final Four, Butler beat Michigan State with a 52-50 win to advance to the 2010 National Title Game for their 1st ever trip to the National Title Game.

Duke

Duke entered the 2010 NCAA tournament as the #1 seed in the South Regional. In the 1st round of the 2010 NCAA Tournament, Duke beat Arkansas-Pine Bluff 73-44. In the 2nd round of the 2010 NCAA Tournament, Duke beat California 68-53. In the Sweet 16 of the 2010 NCAA Tournament, Kyle Singler had 24 points and Jon Scheyer had 18 points to beat Purdue 70-57. In the Elite Eight of the 2010 NCAA Tournament, Nolan Smith scored 29 points to lead Duke to a 78-71 victory over Baylor to advance to the 2010 Final Four. In the 2010 Final Four, Duke beat West Virginia 78-57 to advance to the 2010 National Title game which was their 1st trip to the National Title Game since the 2001 National Title Game.

Starting lineups

Game summary

1st Half
Nolan Smith got Duke off to a hot start scoring four points in the 1st two and a half minutes to give Duke an early 6-1 lead. Shelvin Mack got Butler back into the game making two three-pointers in the next 3 minutes to give Butler a 12-11 lead. Shelvin Mack kept Butler going as Butler would have a 20-18 lead at the under-8 TV Timeout. Then, Jon Scheyer would score four points in the next three minutes leading Duke to an 8-0 run giving them a 26-20 lead and Butler would call a 30-second timeout. During the next 70 seconds, Avery Jukes would score five points leading Butler to a 7-0 run which would result in a 27-26 Butler lead. While Jukes scored five points in the final two and a half minutes of the 1st half, Jon Scheyer scored four in that same time frame and Duke would lead 33-32 at halftime.

2nd Half
During the 1st seven minutes of the 2nd half, neither team took a lead larger than 2 while Duke would have a 45-43 lead when they called a 30-second timeout. Then, Brian Zoubek would make a basket to give Duke a 47-43 lead. In the next 35 seconds, Gordon Hayward made two free throws to cut the Duke lead to 49-47. In the next minute, Jon Scheyer scored five points to give Duke a 56-51 lead. During the next 35 seconds after Butler called a 30-second timeout, Matt Howard and Gordon Hayward each made a pair of free throws to cut the Duke lead to 56-55 and Duke would call a 30-second timeout. Then, Kyle Singler made a basket to give Duke a 58-55 lead and Butler would call a 30-second timeout. With 3:16 remaining, Nolan Smith made a pair of free throws to give Duke a 60-55 lead. Within the next minute after 1:50 was remaining in the game, Matt Howard scored four points to cut the Duke lead to 60-59. With 3 seconds left, Brian Zoubek made one of two free throws to give Duke a 61-59 lead. Gordon Hayward narrowly missed a buzzer-beating half-court shot which would have won the game for Butler and it resulted in a 61-59 win for Duke and the National Championship.

References

NCAA Division I Men's Basketball Championship Game
NCAA Division I Men's Basketball Championship Games
Butler Bulldogs men's basketball
Duke Blue Devils men's basketball
College basketball tournaments in Indiana
Basketball competitions in Indianapolis
NCAA Division I Men's Basketball Championship Game
2010s in Indianapolis